The men's 20 kilometres walk event at the 2014 African Championships in Athletics was held on August 14 in Marrakech.

Results

References

2014 African Championships in Athletics
Racewalking at the African Championships in Athletics